The 1972 United States presidential election in Connecticut took place on November 7, 1972. All 50 states and the District of Columbia were part of the 1972 United States presidential election. Connecticut voters chose eight electors to the Electoral College, who voted for president and vice president.

Connecticut was won by the Republican nominees, incumbent President Richard Nixon of California and his running mate Vice President Spiro Agnew of Maryland. Nixon and Agnew defeated the Democratic nominees, Senator George McGovern of South Dakota and his running mate U.S. Ambassador Sargent Shriver of Maryland.

Nixon carried Connecticut with 58.57% of the vote to McGovern's 40.13%, a victory margin of 18.44%. He won every county in the state, but this result nonetheless made Connecticut almost 5% more Democratic than the nation-at-large.

Nixon’s victory was the first of five consecutive victories in the state, as Connecticut would not be won by a Democratic candidate again until Bill Clinton in 1992. Since then, Connecticut has become a safe Democratic state. 

As of 2020, this was the most recent presidential election in which the Republican nominee carried the cities of Bridgeport and New London.

Results

By county

See also
 United States presidential elections in Connecticut

References

Connecticut
1972
1972 Connecticut elections